William Langton (died 1279)  was a medieval archbishop-elect of York.

William Langton may also refer to:

William Langton (died 1221), Abbot of Shrewsbury
William Langton (MP) (died 1659), English lawyer and politician
William Langton (banker) (1803–1881), English financier and antiquarian 
William Langton (priest), Dean of Clogher, 1743–1761
William Gore-Langton (1760–1847), British politician
William Gore-Langton (1824–1873), British politician
William Temple-Gore-Langton, 4th Earl Temple of Stowe (1847–1904), British politician